Dronningens vagtmester is a 1963 Danish drama film based on the novel of the same name by Carit Etlar. It was directed by Johan Jacobsen and starring Poul Reichhardt. It followed the 1961 film Gøngehøvdingen.

Cast

Poul Reichhardt as Ib
Jens Østerholm as Svend Gønge
Birgitte Federspiel as Kulsoen
Gunnar Lauring as Kaptajn Esner
Ghita Nørby as Inger
Vivi Bach as Adelsdatteren (as Vivi Bak)
Karin Nellemose as Adelsfruen
Ove Sprogøe as Tam
Pauline Schumann as Dronning Sophie Amalie
Poul Finn Poulsen as Palle
Henrik Wiehe as Junker Rud
Bent Vejlby as Jens Jerntrøje
Svend Johansen as Svensk fenrik
William Rosenberg as Dronningens 1. rytter
Benny Juhlin as Olav, svensk dragon
Jørgen Kiil as Rosenkrantz
Willy Rathnov as En gønge
Karen Berg as Mette Gyde
Niels Dybeck as Sveriges fægtekonge
Ole Wegener 
Per Wiking as Gønge
William Kisum
Erik Kühnau as Gønge
Carl Nielsen
Kurt Erik Nielsen
Bjørn Spiro as Svensk soldat
Alex Suhr

References

External links

1963 films
1960s Danish-language films
1963 drama films
Films directed by Johan Jacobsen
Danish drama films
Films set in the 1650s
Films set in the 1660s